The Focke-Wulf Fw 58 Weihe (Harrier) was a German aircraft, built to fill a request by the Luftwaffe for a multi-role aircraft, to be used as an advanced trainer for pilots, gunners and radio operators.

Design and development
The Fw 58 was a low-wing monoplane with two piston engines mounted in nacelles on the wing leading edges. The crew sat under an enclosed canopy. Aft of the flight deck, the fuselage was open to form a moveable machine gun station. The tailwheel undercarriage was retractable.

Operational history
The Fw 58 was widely used for training Luftwaffe personnel. It was also used as a VIP transport, ambulance, feeder airliner, photo reconnaissance and weather research aircraft. It was built under license in Bulgaria, Hungary and Brazil. It was also operated by several countries such as the Netherlands, Romania, Croatia and Turkey.

Variants
Fw 58 V1
First prototype, first flown in 1934
Fw 58 V2
Second prototype.
Fw 58 V3
Third prototype.
Fw 58 V4
Fourth prototype.
Fw 58 V14
Fw 58 V14, D- OPDR, was fitted with Fowler flaps and boundary-layer suction for high-lift experiments at AVA, Göttingen.  The suction system was powered by a Hirth aircraft engine in the fuselage and the air exited through two circumferential, parallel rows of slots in the rear fuselage section.
Fw 58B

Fw 58B-1

Fw 58B-2
This version had a glazed nose and was armed with a 7.92 mm (0.312 in) MG 15 machine gun.
Fw 58C

Fw 58W
Twin-floatplane version.

Operators

 Austrian Air Force

 Argentine Air Force - 3 imported, (1938–1952)

 Brazilian Navy - license-built from 1938
 Brazilian Air Force
 Syndicato Condor
 Varig

 Bulgarian Air Force - 8 imported in 1937-1939

 Croatian Air Force

 Czechoslovakian Air Force

 Finnish Air Force

 Luftwaffe

 Hungarian Air Force - license production

 Royal Netherlands Air Force

 Royal Norwegian Air Force (Postwar)

 Polish Air Force

 Royal Romanian Air Force
 Romanian Air Force (Postwar)
 Transnistrian air section

 Slovak Air Force (1939–1945)

 Spanish Air Force

 Turkish Air Force

 Soviet Air Force

Surviving aircraft
The only Fw 58 on display is at Museu Aeroespacial in Rio de Janeiro, Brazil. Brazil used this airplane mainly for maritime patrols and the example on display was one of the 25 Fw 58B-2 units license-built in Brazil by Fábrica de Galeão, circa 1941.

An Fw 58 C-2 is stored in the Norwegian Aviation Museum in Bodø.

An Fw 58 C crashed on 30 March 1943 in the Lac du Bourget, France, after a low-flying training pass over the lake went wrong. Two of the four airmen on board were rescued by local fishermen. The wreckage lies at a depth of over 112 meters. Due to the dark and cold water, it is still fairly well preserved, though the canvas over the tube frame light structure is gradually deteriorating. A proposal has  been made to raise the wreckage, but local divers are strongly opposed because of its status as a war grave, and the risks of damaging it.

Specifications (Fw 58B)

See also

References

Bibliography

External links

 http://www2.fab.mil.br/musal/index.php/anvs/312-weihe

Fw 058
1930s German military trainer aircraft
World War II trainer aircraft of Germany
Low-wing aircraft
Twin piston-engined tractor aircraft
Aircraft first flown in 1935